Jean-Baptiste Carrier (16 March 1756 – 16 December 1794) was a French Revolutionary and politician most notable for his actions in the War in the Vendée during the Reign of Terror.  While under orders to suppress a Royalist counter-revolution, he commanded the execution of 4,000 civilians, mainly priests, women and children in Nantes, some by drowning in the river Loire, which Carrier described as "the National Bathtub." After the fall of the Robespierre government, Carrier was tried for war crimes by the Revolutionary Tribunal, found guilty, and executed.

Early life

Carrier was born at Yolet, a village near Aurillac in upper Auvergne, as the fourth of six children born to Jean Carrier and Marguerite Puex. As the son of a middle class tenant farmer, Carrier and his family survived on income reaped from cultivating the land of a French nobleman.  After attending a Jesuit school in Aurillac, he was able to pursue a wide variety of career interests. Carrier worked in a law office in Paris until 1785 when he returned to Aurillac, married, and with the outbreak of the Revolution joined the National Guard and the Jacobin Club. In 1790 he was a country attorney (counsellor for the bailliage of Aurillac) and in 1792 was elected deputy to the National Convention from Cantal. He was already known as one of the influential members of the Cordeliers and the Jacobin Club.
After the subjugation of Flanders he was one of the commissioners nominated in the close of 1792 by the convention. He voted for the execution of King Louis XVI of France, was one of the first to call for the arrest of the Duke of Orléans  and took a prominent part in the overthrow of the Girondists (on 31 May).

Representative to Nantes 

After a mission to Normandy, Carrier was sent, early in October 1793, to Nantes, as a representative on mission under orders from the National Convention to suppress the revolt of anti-revolutionists. He established a revolutionary tribunal in Nantes and formed what was called the Legion of Marat, to dispose quickly of the masses of prisoners heaped in the jails. The trials were soon discontinued, and the victims were sent to the guillotine, shot, or disposed of in another way.

In a twenty-page letter to his fellow republicans, Carrier promised not to leave a single counter-revolutionary or monopolist (in reference to hoarders and aristocratic land owners) at large in Nantes. His vigorous action was endorsed by the Committee of Public Safety, and in the following days Carrier put large numbers of prisoners aboard vessels with trap doors for bottoms, and sank them in the Loire river. These executions, especially of priests and nuns, as well as women and children, known as the Drownings at Nantes (Noyades), along with his increasing demeanor, gained Carrier a reputation for wanton cruelty. He ordered the drowning in the Loire of 94 priests in November 1793. Some alleged that he ordered young male and female prisoners be tied together naked before the drownings, a method which was called a "republican marriage", but this accusation was later found to be a rumor started by counter-revolutionaries.

He was described by Adolphe Thiers as being "one of those inferior and violent spirits, who in the excitement of civil wars become monsters of cruelty and extravagance."

Trial and execution

On 8 February 1794, Carrier was recalled to Paris by Robespierre, after a member of the Committee of Public Safety returned from Nantes with information about the atrocities being carried out, although Carrier himself wasn't put on trial. A few months later, the Thermidorian reaction led to the fall of Robespierre and the Committee of Public Safety. Carrier's position became dangerously exposed. Prisoners he had brought from Nantes were acquitted and released, and denunciations of Carrier's actions increased. On 3 September 1794 Carrier was arrested.

At his trial before the Revolutionary Tribunal, Carrier was quick to denounce allegations of inhumanity, stating "I took but little share in the policing of Nantes; I was only there in passing, being first at Rennes and later with the army. My principal task was to watch over and see to the victualing of our troops, and for six months I supplied 200,000 men there without its costing the State a halfpenny. Hence I have little information to offer in the matter. I know little or nothing of the accused." After this statement, a fellow representative, Phélippes, sprang to his feet and vocally charged Carrier with drownings, wholesale executions, demolitions, thefts, pillaging, laying waste to Nantes, famine and disorder, and with the butchering of women and children. Men from the "Marat Company", a militia that Carrier used to purge Nantes, were present during the trial, including Perro-Chaux, Lévêque, Bollogniel, Grandmaison, and Mainguet. All these men were appointed directly and indirectly by Carrier and all were part of the Revolutionary Committee of Nantes. The jury that heard Carrier's case was left dumbfounded as the trial closed, and passed a unanimous vote for Carrier's execution.

The Revolutionary Tribunal therefore declared him guilty of, among other crimes, mass executions of citizens who did not fight against the Republic, through drownings and firing squads, carried out "knowingly, viciously, and with counter-revolutionary intent". Along with two accomplices from the revolutionary committee of Nantes, Carrier was executed by the guillotine in Paris, on 16 December 1794.

References

Bibliography

 Carrier, Jean-Baptiste, Correspondence of Jean-Baptiste Carrier: people's representative to the Convention during his mission in Brittany, 1793-1794, Nantes: John Lane Company, 1920, Google Books, downloadable eBook.
Hanson, Paul R.  Historical Dictionary of the French Revolution.  France: Scarecrow Press, 2004.
Joes, Anthony James.  Guerilla Conflict before the cold war.  Westport: Greenwood Publishing Group, 1996.
Lenotre, G. The French Revolution in Brittany.  Edinburgh: Ballantyne, Hanson & Co, 1912.
Lenotre, G.  Tragic Episodes of the French Revolution in Brittany, With Unpublished Documents.  Trans. H. Havelock. London: David Nutt, 1912.
Stephens, Henry Morse.  A History of the French Revolution.  Vol. 3.   New York:  Charles Scribner%27s Sons, 1891.
Thiers, Adolphe and Frederic Shoberl.  The History of the French Revolution. Vol. 3.  New York: D. Appleton & Co, 1866.
Webster, Noah.  Webster's New Universal Unabridged Dictionary.  Vol. 2.  New York: Simon & Schuster, 1983.

 

1756 births
1794 deaths
People from Cantal
Deputies to the French National Convention
Republican military leaders of the War in the Vendée
French people executed by guillotine during the French Revolution
Représentants en mission
French people convicted of war crimes
Politicide perpetrators
People of the Reign of Terror
Executed mass murderers
Jacobins